Taboh Naning is a state constituency in Malacca, Malaysia, that has been represented in the Melaka State Legislative Assembly.

The state constituency was first contested in 2004 and is mandated to return a single Assemblyman to the Melaka State Legislative Assembly under the first-past-the-post voting system. , the State assemblywoman for Taboh Naning is Zulkiflee Mohd Zin from United Malays National Organisation (UMNO) which is part of the state's ruling coalition, Barisan Nasional (BN).

Definition 
The Taboh Naning constituency contains the polling districts of Cherana Puteh, Simpang Empat, Berisu, Sungai Buloh, Batang Melekek, Rantau Panjang and Ayer Paabas.

Demographics

History

Polling districts
According to the gazette issued on 31 October 2022, the Taboh Naning constituency has a total of 7 polling districts.

Representation history

Election results

References

Malacca state constituencies